Ying e Chi (影意志) is a non-profit organization formed in 1997 by a group of independent filmmakers in Hong Kong. Independent film makers of Ying e Chi include Vincent Chui, Kwok Wai-lun, Simon Chung, Charlie Lam and Lawrence Wong. Ying e Chi founded the Hong Kong Asian Film Festival.

References

External links
 Official website

Film organisations in Hong Kong